Badamdan (also Romanized as Bādāmdān; also known as Bādāmān) is a village in Sar Asiab-e Yusefi Rural District, Bahmai-ye Garmsiri District, Bahmai County, Kohgiluyeh and Boyer-Ahmad Province, Iran. At the 2006 census, its population was 44, in 10 families.

References 

Populated places in Bahmai County